Euzhan Palcy (born 13 January 1958) is a French film director, screenwriter, and producer. Her films are known to explore themes of race, gender, and politics, with an emphasis on the perpetuated effects of colonialism. Palcy's first feature film Sugar Cane Alley (1983) received numerous awards including the César Award for Best First Feature Film. For directing A Dry White Season (1989), she became the first black female director to have a film produced by a major Hollywood studio, that being by MGM.

Palcy also directed the independent film Siméon (1992). She has since moved towards directing documentaries and television projects such as Aimé Césaire: A Voice for History (1994). She then directed the television films Ruby Bridges (1998) and The Killing Yard (2001), as well as the documentary The Journey of the Dissidents (2005) and the miniseries The Brides of Bourbon Island (2007).

Throughout her career, Palcy has explored various genres, often breaking ground being the first female black director to do so. She is the first black director to win a César Award and the Venice Film Festival's Silver Lion, both for Sugar Cane Alley (1983). In 2022, she was given the Academy Honorary Award for her contributions to cinema.

Early life and education 
Euzhan Palcy was born in Martinique, an overseas department and region of France. Palcy grew up studying the films of Fritz Lang, Alfred Hitchcock, Billy Wilder and Orson Welles. She decided at the young age of ten to become a filmmaker, largely due to the imprecise depictions of black people in film and television, and her desire for a more accurate portrayal. Euzhan went to college at home in Martinique, and eventually found work at a local TV network. When she was a teenager, her success as a poet and songwriter led to her being asked to do a weekly poetry program on local television. It was there she wrote and directed the short film La Messagère, and began her filmmaking career. The drama, which centers on the relationship between a girl and her grandmother, and which explores the lives of workers on a banana plantation, was the first West Indian production mounted in Martinique.

She left for Paris in 1975 to earn a master's degree in French literature, in theater, at the Sorbonne, a D.E.A. in Art and Archeology and a film degree (specializing in cinematography) from renowned Louis Lumière College. Palcy soon began a film adaptation of Joseph Zobel’s novel Black Shack Alley, a semi-autobiographical novel that explores the struggle for change with shifting race relations. Palcy states, “I discovered the novel when I was fourteen. It was the first time I read a novel by a black man, a black of my country, a black who was speaking about poor people.” As she became acquainted with members of the French film community, Palcy received encouragement from New Wave filmmaker François Truffaut and his collaborator Suzanne Shiffman. In 1982 the French government provided partial funding for the film.

Career

Early work 
It was in Paris, with the encouragement of her "French Godfather", François Truffaut that she was able to put together her first feature, Sugar Cane Alley (1983). Shot for less than $1,000,000, it documents life on a Martinique sugar cane plantation in the 1930s through the eyes of a young boy. Sugar Cane Alley won more than 17 international awards, including the Venice Film Festival Silver Lion, as well as the Coppa Volpi (Volpi Cup) for Best Lead Actress Award (Darling Legitimus). It also won the prestigious César Award (the French equivalent to an Academy Award) for best first feature film. Among the firsts, it won the Special Jury Award at the Worldfest-Houston International Film Festival and the first Public Award at the Fespaco: Africa's biggest film festival. After seeing Palcy's work, Robert Redford handpicked her to attend the 1984 Sundance Director's Lab (Sundance Institute), becoming her "American Godfather".

A Dry White Season 

In 1989, Euzhan Palcy wrote and directed A Dry White Season, an American drama film directed by Euzhan Palcy and starring Donald Sutherland, Jürgen Prochnow, Marlon Brando, Janet Suzman, Zakes Mokae and Susan Sarandon. It was written by Colin Welland and Palcy, based upon André Brink's novel A Dry White Season. It is set in South Africa in 1976 and deals with the subject of apartheid. She is also the only woman filmmaker to have directed Marlon Brando, whom she brought back to the screen after a gap of nine years.

Impressed by Palcy's commitment to social change, Marlon Brando came out of retirement, agreeing to act in A Dry White Season (1989) for free. Palcy was also the first black director to direct an actor to an Oscar nomination Also starring in the film were actors Donald Sutherland and Susan Sarandon. Palcy adapted A Dry White Season from the novel by South African writer André Brink. The story focuses on the social movements of South Africa and the Soweto riots, and was heralded for putting the politics of apartheid into meaningful human terms. Palcy was so passionate about creating an accurate story depicting the reality of apartheid that she risked her life traveling undercover to South Africa. To research the riots, she was introduced to the people of Soweto township by Dr Motlana (Nelson Mandela's and Desmond Tutu's personal physician), while she eluded the South African secret services posing as a recording artist.

Palcy became the first black female director produced by a major Hollywood studio and is the only black filmmaker who succeeded in making in the U.S. a narrative feature against apartheid on the silver screen during the 27 years of Nelson Mandela's incarceration. The late Senator Ted Kennedy supported the Filmmaker. Brando's performance in the movie earned him his 8th and last Academy Award nomination for Best Supporting Actor and he received the Best Actor Award at the Tokyo Film Festival. For her outstanding cinematic achievement, Palcy received the "Orson Welles Award" in Los Angeles. For the first anniversary of his election Mandela welcomed Euzhan Palcy in South Africa and granted her an exclusive interview that has yet to be discovered.

By 1992, Palcy veered away from the serious subject matter of her previous films to show the spirit and liveliness of her native Martinique with Simeon (1992), a musical comedic fairytale set in the Caribbean and Paris. She remained in France to create her first feature three-part documentary, Aimé Césaire, A Voice For History (1994) about the famed Martinican poet, playwright, and philosopher. 

She then worked for Disney/ABC Studios, directing and producing an episode of The Wonderful World of Disney entitled, Ruby Bridges (1998), the story of Ruby Bridges, the little New Orleans girl who was the first to integrate the public schools, immortalized in the painting by Norman Rockwell. President Bill Clinton and Disney President, Michael Eisner introduced the film from the White House to American audiences. Palcy’s film won four awards, including The Christopher Awards, The Humanitas Prize, the National Educational Media Network Gold Apple and best performance Young actress award Young Artists Awards. For Paramount/Showtime Studios, Palcy directed The Killing Yard (2001), starring Alan Alda and Morris Chestnut. The drama is based on the true events surrounding the 1971 Attica prison riot, which had an indelible impact on the American prison system and jury process. The film won the Silver Gavel Award from the American Bar Association.

Later career 
In 2005 Palcy returned to the documentary to direct Parcours de Dissidents ("The Journey of the Dissidents"), narrated by Gérard Depardieu. The film tells the story of the forgotten history of “dissidents”, the men and women of Martinique and Guadeloupe who left their islands between 1940 and 1943. In 2007 Palcy wrote and directed Les Mariées de I’isles Bourbon (The Brides of Bourbon Island) (2007), a romantic historical epic adventure.

In 2006, she wrote and directed the documentary Parcours de Dissidents (The Journey of the Dissidents), narrated by Oscar-nominated and French actor Gérard Depardieu, about the unknown odyssey of the men and women from the islands of Martinique and Guadeloupe (FWI) many of who were trained at Fort Dix, New Jersey, during WWII and fought throughout the liberation of France. On June 18, 2011, Palcy’s The Journey of the Dissidents (Parcours de Dissidents) was screened at the French Military School at the invitation of the French Minister of Defense and the Minister of Overseas Territories. A National Exhibition (La Dissidence en Martinique et en Guadeloupe 1940–1945), based on her film, was launched at the French National Staff Headquarters on July 7 and is currently exhibited simultaneously in everyone of the 101 Prefectures (equivalent of our Federal government building of every counties) along with the screening of her film.

Palcy wrote and directed the French three-hour period piece set in the 17th century, Les Mariées de I’isles Bourbon (The Brides of Bourbon Island) (2007). It tells of a romantic, historic epic action adventure where three women survive a harrowing ocean voyage from France to forcibly marry French expatriates on the island of Réunion.

Palcy’s drive for the life and compassion for humanity inspire each and every project with which she is involved. Her passion spills into all areas of cinematic lexicon to include the animation, thriller, comedy and action genres. For Fox Studios, Palcy developed an animated feature, currently entitled Katoumbaza. She is actively developing a feature film, on Bessie Coleman, for which she recorded the very last witness of the first African-American woman aviator journey in France, and an action comedy set in Los Angeles and Paris. Palcy has chosen Teaching Toots, a comedy drama on illiteracy – a project close to her heart – to be her next film to co-produce and direct. Her interest in humanitarian work and supporting the younger generation has been known for years. Her last production has been Moly, a biographical short on young disabled one-legged Senegalese filmmaker Moly Kane. The film was screened in Cannes to rapturous public acclaim. Palcy announced on stage that Moly Kane would receive the prosthetic leg of his dreams so that he could be free to film with his camera.

Style and themes 
The geographical setting varies from project to project, yet Palcy's focus on Black culture remains constant. Her films stress the themes and issues that are continuous across the physical space that separates Martinique from France, from South Africa, from America.

Themes of colonialism are present in Sugarcane Alley, A Dry White Season, and many of her other works. "Euzhan Palcy's two films Rue cases negres / Sugar Cane Alley (1983) and A Dry White Season (1989) share a set of thematic equivalences that represent postcolonial perspectives on Pan-African identities and experiences. In both instances the films focus is on the experiences of black communities and the atrocities they have suffered at the hands of their enslavers or oppressors."

Palcy often uses non professional actors in her films, and works with them to ensure a feeling of authenticity is maintained. In Sugarcane Alley, many actors were actual workers from the sugarcane plantation, and Palcy had them live on set for two months prior to the shooting date. Palcy explains, “We did the shooting in the middle of a sugarcane plantation, we built that set, so I asked the people all around, the sugarcane workers, to bring their pigs, their cattle, to bring everything there, and I asked everyone to live in the house on the plantation. So for two months in advance they were there every day. They were there having fun barbecuing, playing.”

In A Dry White Season Palcy wanted to get people from South Africa who were actually living in apartheid to act in these scenes. However, in order to get people from South Africa into Zimbabwe, many legal hurdles had to be leapt since South Africans weren’t allowed to cross into their neighboring country with conventional methods. Palcy decided to go the extra mile to fly the cast from South Africa to London on an “artist” visa, then from there fly the cast to Zimbabwe. Palcy explains the difficulty: “We couldn’t let any journalists get in because of all the South African actors we had, we had to make them go to England, take them from England, bring them back to Zimbabwe, because the Black South Africans didn’t have the right to have a passport, so in order to get a passport you had to be an artist… They said they had a deal to be in a play, so that was how they got their passports.”

Filmography

Film

Television

Awards and nominations 
 1983: Venice Film Festival, Silver Lion, Best First Work for Rue cases nègres
 1983: Venice Film Festival, UNICEF Award for Rue cases nègres
 1983: Venice Film Festival, OCIC Award for Rue cases nègres
 1983: Venice Film Festival, Golden Lion (nominee) for Rue cases nègres 
 1984: César Awards, César, Best First Work (Meilleure première oeuvre) for Rue cases nègres 
 1989: Tokyo International Film Festival, Tokyo Grand Prix (nominee) for A Dry White Season
 1990: National Coalition of 100 Black Women, Candace Award for Trailblazing
 2001: Cannes Film Festival, Sojourner Truth Award
2002: Silver Gavel Award by the American Bar Association for The Killing Yard 
2013: Cannes Classics official selection for Simeon

Legacy and recognition 
 1984: First woman and first black director winner of a French Oscar
1989: Glamour Magazine, 10 Most Inspiring Women
1994: John Guggenheim Fellowship for Creative Arts
 1995: Chevalier de l'Ordre national du Mérite
 1997: Cinema Euzhan Palcy in Amiens, France, movie theater named in her honor
 2000: Martinique's first high school dedicated to film study was after her and she was presented with the Sojourner Truth Award at the 2001 Cannes Film Festival
 2004: National Order of the Legion of Honour  Palcy is a Citizen of Honour of New York, Atlanta, New Orleans, and Sarasota, Fl.
 March 25, 2007, the National Maritime Museum in London launched her first retrospective with the screening of Sugar Cane Alley. Later that year the British Film Institute / BBC online poll on "The 100 Black Screen Icons" of the last 100 years ranked it number 3.
 October 2009, she received the Unita Blackwell Award in Las Vegas for the 35th anniversary of the National Conference of Black Mayors.
 December 2009, Sugar Cane Alley, was selected for the third time by the French National Educational Organization (the organization that chooses the films from all over the world to be studied in French schools), breaking the record for any participating film in the history of the organization. In December 2009, Palcy was the patron of the 20th anniversary of the organization at the Cinémathèque (the French Museum of Cinema) with Minister of Culture Frédéric Mitterrand and director Costa Gavras. In 2010, she was the Honoree of France Black Art Awards, broadcast on France Television Group, and was the first recipient of the Art and Media Prize of the Gotha Noir de France (France Black Who’s Who) and in December 2010, she was honored at the Women’s Gala of 3rd World Black Arts Festival of Culture in Senegal, the biggest African festival.
 April 6, 2011, Palcy directed Le Film Hommage that introduced “France National Tribute to Aimé Césaire at the Pantheon” with the keynote speech of French President Nicolas Sarkozy in front of an audience 1,000 dignitaries. The event was broadcast live on the French National TV (France 2).
 May 14, 2011, French Minister of Culture Frederic Mitterrand and Cannes Film Festival paid tribute to the director with the screening of Sugar Cane Alley in the prestigious Cannes Classics Series (Cannes official selection of the Masterpieces of the Century). Heralded as one of the most important independent film of the last 50 years Sugar Cane Alley is studied in most colleges and US universities (in Cinema studies, French studies, and African-American studies) In February 2009, Philadelphia Inquirer veteran film critic Carrie Rickey put Sugar Cane Alley in her top list of films that should be screened at the White House to keep hope alive.
 May 18, 2011, the Museum of Modern Art in New York City honoured her as "Filmmaker in Focus: Euzhan Palcy" (May 18–May 30), the first retrospective of her career and “first retrospective of a black woman filmmaker at the MoMA”. The Department of Film has acquired for its collection new 35mm prints of Palcy’s Rue Cases-Nègres and Siméon (1992), her Caribbean musical-comedy fairytale—which by the closing credits of its New York premiere at MoMA last Friday had literally sparked dancing in the aisles of the theater, said Ron Magliozzi, the assistant film curator of MoMA.
 September 12, 2011, the Director General of UNESCO, Irina Bokova, named Palcy in the international sponsoring committee for the Unesco program of 2011–13 -- “TAGORE, NERUDA and CESAIRE, for a reconciled universal”.
 September 28, 2011, Palcy received the Officer Medal of the National Order of Merit from French President Sarkozy at the Palais de l'Elysee.
 October 13, 2011, Palcy opened the 7th Women's Forum in Deauville.
2011: Cannes Film Festival's Tribute to Euzhan Palcy
2011: Elle.fr magazine's 17 Most Influential Women of the Planet
 2013–present: National Committee for the Memory and History of Slavery (CNMHE), Member
2013: First woman President of the Fespaco Grand Jury
2013: Henri Langlois World Cinema Honor Award
2013: Unveiling of the Euzhan Palcy road
2015: Tribute to Euzhan Palcy by the American Cinematheque
2016: Sabela International Recognition Award (South Africa Honorary Award)
2018: Inductee on the Black Achiever's Wall of the International Slavery Museum of Liverpool for the Centenary of the Women's Vote in the UK.
2019: The WRAP: 17 Women Who Revolutionized Hollywood (All-time list)
2019: Inductee on the June Caribbean-American Heritage Wall of Fame
2019: Montreal Black Film Festival Pioneer Award
2021: Toronto International Film Festival 'Share Her Journey' Ambassador
2022: Academy Honorary Award

References

Further reading 
 The films of Euzhan Palcy, Hell Is For Hyphenates, July 31, 2014

External links 

 
 
 

1958 births
20th-century French screenwriters
21st-century French screenwriters
Academy Honorary Award recipients
Chevaliers of the Légion d'honneur
English-language film directors
French film directors
French screenwriters
French women film directors
French women screenwriters
Living people
Martiniquais emigrants to the United States
Officers of the Ordre national du Mérite
University of Paris alumni